Michelau railway station is a railway station serving the town of Michelau, in the commune of Bourscheid, in north-eastern Luxembourg.  It is operated by Chemins de Fer Luxembourgeois, the state-owned railway company.

The station is situated on Line 10, which connects Luxembourg City to the centre and north of the country.

External links
 Official CFL page on Michelau station
 Rail.lu page on Michelau station

Bourscheid, Luxembourg
Railway stations in Luxembourg
Railway stations on CFL Line 10